Michael Venditto (born June 30, 1981 in Massapequa, New York) is a former Republican New York State Senator, previously representing District 8, which comprises the South Shore of Long Island beginning with Baldwin in the West and ending with West Babylon in the East. First elected in 2014, he served as Chairman of the Consumer Protection Committee, and on the Codes, Higher Education, Insurance, Judiciary, Labor, Libraries, and Crime Victims, Crime and Correction committees and on the Heroin Task Force.

Before his election to the state senate, Venditto served as a Nassau County Legislator from the 12th District, replacing the deceased Presiding Officer Peter J. Schmitt. Venditto began his career working as an attorney for the Town of Hempstead, New York. He resides in the hamlet of Massapequa with his wife and son.

Early life and education

Venditto has spent his entire life in the South Shore communities that make up the 8th Senate District. He attended public schools and graduated from Farmingdale High School. He earned his B.A. from Hofstra University and his J.D. from St. John's University School of Law.  He now lives in Massapequa, with his wife Antonella and their son Andrew.

New York State Senate 
Venditto ran for the New York State Senate in 2014 to succeed former Senator Charles Fuschillo, who resigned to become the head of the Alzheimer's Foundation. Michael, on the Republican, Conservative, and Independence lines, won with 56.7% of the vote.

References

External links

Living people
People from Massapequa, New York
New York (state) Republicans
1981 births
21st-century American politicians
Farmingdale High School alumni